The 1928 Tasmanian state election was held on 30 May 1928. Since the last election, members of Sir Walter Lee's dissident Liberal grouping had rejoined the Nationalist Party.

Retiring Members

Nationalist
James Newton MHA (Bass)

House of Assembly
Sitting members are shown in bold text. Tickets that elected at least one MHA are highlighted in the relevant colour. Successful candidates are indicated by an asterisk (*).

Bass
Six seats were up for election. The Labor Party was defending three seats. The Nationalist Party was defending three seats (two Liberals and one Nationalist).

Darwin
Six seats were up for election. The Labor Party was defending three seats. The Nationalist Party was defending three seats (two Nationalists and one Liberal).

Denison
Six seats were up for election. The Labor Party was defending four seats. The Nationalist Party was defending two seats.

Franklin
Six seats were up for election. The Labor Party was defending three seats. The Nationalist Party was defending one seat, although independent MHA John Piggott had joined the Nationalists. Independent MHA Peter Murdoch was defending one seat.

Wilmot
Six seats were up for election. The Labor Party was defending three seats. The Nationalist Party was defending two seats (one Nationalist, one Liberal). Independent MHA Norman Cameron was defending one seat.

See also
 Members of the Tasmanian House of Assembly, 1925–1928
 Members of the Tasmanian House of Assembly, 1928–1931

References
Tasmanian Parliamentary Library

Candidates for Tasmanian state elections